John Moore Julian (14 February 1885 – 25 August 1933) was an Australian rules footballer who played with St Kilda in the Victorian Football League (VFL).

Notes

External links 

1885 births
1933 deaths
Australian rules footballers from Melbourne
St Kilda Football Club players